Kate, the Cat and the Moon is a 2004 Children's picture book by David Almond and Stephen Lambert. It is about a girl, Kate, and her nighttime adventures with a feline companion when she transforms into a cat.

Reception
In a review of Kate, the Cat and the Moon, Booklist wrote "Almond, .. writes beautifully about Kate's foray into the night, .. Lambert's thickly applied colors and strong, sturdy shapes give the art a robust, muscular feel that balances the dreamy conceit." and the School Library Journal wrote "This bedtime fantasy is sure to earn Almond new fans." concluding "This book will charm feline fanatics everywhere."  Kirkus Reviews wrote "The slightly mystical quality of Almond’s text seems somewhat mismatched with Lambert’s gleeful but more solid visuals. One hopes that Almond will do more picture books with less grounded illustrations that let his odd spiritual tone show through; this one, meanwhile, is a lovely and safe adventure."

It has been called a "small, lyric gem.", and "Simple and elegant".

Kate, the Cat and the Moon has also been reviewed by Reading Time, and the  Library Media Connection magazine.

References

External links

Library holdings of Kate, the Cat and the Moon

2004 children's books
British picture books
Fictional cats
Books about cats